Graphic Era Deemed to be University (formerly Graphic Era Institute of Technology) is a private deemed-to-be university in Clement Town, Dehradun, Uttarakhand, India.

History

Graphic Era was founded in 1993 by Dr. Kamal Ghanshala and started with undergraduate programs in core engineering and allied sciences. It is situated in Dehradun, Uttarakhand. In 2008 the institute was accorded the status of deemed university. In 2022 Graphic Era was accredited by the National Assessment and Accreditation Council (NAAC) with grade 'A+'.

Academics

Recognition and accreditation 
 Deemed university status under General Category 14 August 2008 See: Ministry of Human Resource Development, GOI, Notification F, 9-48/2007 U-3(A) Under Section 3 of the UGC Act 1956.
 Accredited by National Assessment Accreditation Council (NAAC) with grade 'A+'.
 As of 6 June 2018, it is the only private university in the state of Uttarakhand to have obtained an approval from AICTE (All India Council for Technical Education).

See also
Graphic Era Hill University

References

Universities in Uttarakhand
Engineering colleges in Uttarakhand
Education in Dehradun district
Educational institutions established in 1993
1993 establishments in Uttar Pradesh